Payne v. Tennessee, 501 U.S. 808 (1991), was a United States Supreme Court case which held that testimony in the form of a victim impact statement is admissible during the sentencing phase of a trial and, in death penalty cases, does not violate the Cruel and Unusual Punishment Clause of the Eighth Amendment. Payne narrowed two of the Courts' precedents: Booth v. Maryland (1987) and South Carolina v. Gathers (1989).

Background
Pervis Tyrone Payne (born March 1, 1967) was the defendant in this trial prosecuted in Tennessee. According to his criminal conviction, on Saturday, June 27, 1987, he attempted to rape an acquaintance of his, Charisse Christopher, and murdered her and her two-year-old daughter, Lacie Jo. Neighbors alleged they heard noises and yelling, and called the police. Upon arriving, a police officer "immediately encountered Payne who was leaving the apartment building, so covered in blood that he appeared to be 'sweating blood'".

The defendant, in contrast, said that he was in the building on a visit to his girlfriend and hearing screams from the room of the murder victims he went in to help. Payne and many other witnesses saw a man leaving the crime scene shortly before Payne arrived. He had found the knife still stuck in the throat of Charisse and pulled it out. He fled when he saw police arrive.

The police found "a horrifying scene." Forty-two stab wounds were on Charisse's body, and Lacie Jo and Nicholas, Charisse's three-year-old son, had suffered stab wounds as well. Payne fled to his girlfriend's house, and discarded his clothes, which were allegedly soaked in blood. Meanwhile, Nicholas Christopher held in his intestines while the emergency medical technicians transported him to the emergency room. The physical evidence implicating the defendant was: his fingerprints on cans of malt liquor, the victims' blood soaked into his clothes, and his property left at the scene of the crime.

Dozens of witnesses, including the police, friends, the neighbors, and experts, testified at the trial. The evidence that he perpetrated the attacks was "overwhelming," according to Chief Justice Rehnquist. Payne denied the charges, claiming he came upon the bloody victims. The district attorney stressed, in his closing arguments, the senselessness of the killings, the violence displayed by the defendant, and the innocence of the victims. The jury convicted him of two counts of first-degree murder and two counts of attempted murder and a related charge.

At the sentencing phase, the judge allowed both the public defender to adduce mitigating testimony from the defendant's friends and family, and the district attorney (DA) to introduce evidence from the grandmother/mother of the victims. Payne appealed to the Tennessee Supreme Court, and then asked for a writ of certiorari from the United States Supreme Court. Certiorari was granted, with the Court noting that it would have to reconsider its past precedent. The case was argued on April 24, 1991 and decided on June 27, 1991.

Opinion of the Court
The Court held that testimony in the form of a victim impact statement was admissible and constitutional in death penalty cases, thus expressly limiting two prior cases, Booth v. Maryland (1987) and South Carolina v. Gathers (1989).

Writing for the Court, Chief Justice Rehnquist provided a variety of reasons for the decision:
 The sentencer has the right to consider all relevant evidence, within the rules of evidence.
 The principle that the punishment should fit the crime is relevant here, and this was a particularly aggravated and savage murder.
 Stare decisis is "not an inexorable command", and the Supreme Court, since Marbury v. Madison (1803), has decided what the law is.
 Because the defendant has the right to present mitigating evidence at the sentencing phase, the prosecution should be able to present aggravating evidence about the victim (Justice Stevens, in dissent, characterizes this argument as a non sequitur: the defendant has constitutional rights because he is on trial - the victim is not on trial and has no constitutional rights in the proceeding).
 The trial was fair in all respects, and mitigating evidence ought to be presented with damaging evidence when available.

Justices Stevens and Marshall wrote dissenting opinions, with Justice Blackmun joining each of them.

Impact
Payne has had a significant, ongoing impact in victim's rights, criminology, stare decisis, and the lives of the parties involved.

The case allowed victim impact statements in U.S. courts, and the overwhelming majority of states now allow such use in the sentencing phase of trials, and was a significant development in the victims' rights movement. One scholar wrote:

Another scholar calls the verdict in Payne an example of "symbolic violence." It was pointed out that:

The case was one in a line of cases that showed how the Rehnquist Court shifted to the conservative or "right" on criminal cases. The case is cited by at least one major college text book as a "capstone case."  Colin Starger has pointed out that the current split in the Court's jurisprudence between "strong" and "weak" conceptions of stare decisis (both of which are ultimately descended from a 1932 dissenting opinion by Louis Brandeis) arises from the disagreement between the Rehnquist majority opinion and the Marshall dissenting opinion in this case.

Scheduled executions
Payne's execution was stayed in April 2007, and after protracted litigation, again scheduled in December 2007, and stayed again that month.

Payne was later scheduled to be executed on December 3, 2020. However, he was granted a temporary reprieve until April 9, 2021, due to the COVID-19 pandemic in Tennessee.

Subsequent developments
Payne continues to maintain his innocence and has attracted supporters such as The Innocence Project and The Southern Christian Leadership Conference founded by Dr. Martin Luther King, Jr. In September 2020, DNA testing was ordered to investigate Paynes claims of innocence.

On November 18, 2021, the Shelby County District Attorney General announced that Payne was no longer on death row and would instead serve two consecutive life sentences. Since 2002, executions of people with intellectual disabilities have been ruled unconstitutional in the United States, and a law passed by the Tennessee General Assembly in April 2021 allowed for death row inmates to appeal their sentences on intellectual disability grounds. After a review of the evidence, Payne was found to have an intellectual disability, making him ineligible for execution. On January 31, 2022, Payne was resentenced to two concurrent life sentences, including credit for time served for an assault charge; Payne will be eligible for parole by 2027.

See also
 Crime in the United States
 Criminology
 Crime victim advocacy program
 List of United States Supreme Court cases, volume 501
 List of United States Supreme Court cases
 Lists of United States Supreme Court cases by volume
 List of United States Supreme Court cases by the Rehnquist Court
 Victimology
 Victim Support
 Victim study

References

External links
 
 

United States Supreme Court cases
United States Supreme Court cases of the Rehnquist Court
United States Supreme Court decisions that overrule a prior Supreme Court decision
1991 in United States case law
Cruel and Unusual Punishment Clause and death penalty case law
Victimology
Capital punishment in Tennessee